Pillsbury Crossing is a natural limestone slab that was used by pioneers to cross Deep Creek. The ledge terminates in a waterfall in Riley County, Kansas, USA. Below Pillsbury Crossing, Deep Creek flows into the Kansas River.

The waterfall is named for Josiah Pillsbury, a Free-State settler in Kansas Territory who homesteaded by the crossing in 1855. Pillsbury was a member of the Free-State Topeka Legislature and the failed Leavenworth Constitutional Convention.  

The site is part of Pillsbury Crossing Wildlife Area.

References
Manhattan Mercury, March 20, 2005

External links
Pillsbury Crossing Wildlife Area - official site
Deep Creek Waterfall at Pillsbury Crossing Wildlife Area - Kansas Travel
Pilsbury Crossing - Kansas Geological Survey

Protected areas of Riley County, Kansas
Landforms of Kansas
Recreational areas in Kansas